Ichthyocotylurus is a genus of flatworms belonging to the family Strigeidae.

The species of this genus are found in Europe and Northern America.

Species:
 Ichthyocotylurus erraticus (Rudolphi, 1809) Odening, 1969
 Ichthyocotylurus pileatus (Rudolphi, 1802) Odening, 1969

References

Platyhelminthes